Amauropilio is an extinct genus of harvestmen in the family Sclerosomatidae. It is known from the Chadronian aged Florissant Formation in Colorado.

Species
 Amauropilio atavus (Cockerell, 1907)
 Amauropilio lawei (Petrunkevitch, 1922)

References

Harvestman genera
Extinct arachnids
Florissant Formation